Ashina Buzhen was a member of the ruling caste of the Western Turks. He was appointed khagan by Emperor Gaozong of the Tang dynasty after the conquest of the Western Turks. His fierce rivalry with his cousin, Ashina Mishe, was instrumental in driving the Western Turks away from the Tang and into allegiance with the Tibetan Empire.

Life 
Buzhen was a member of the ruling caste of the Western Turks. According to modern Turkish historian Ahmet Taşağıl, he was a descendant of Istemi. After the Western Turks were conquered by the Chinese Tang dynasty his younger cousin Mishe was created khagan in 632. Angered by this, Buzhen attacked Mishe in 639 and killed 20 people including several of Mishe's brothers and nephews. Consequently, Mishe submitted to the Tang, fearing for his life. Buzhen declared himself Yabghu (khagan) of the Dulu tribes (咄陆叶护) but was not accepted by the Dulu. Having lost prestige, he too submitted to Tang.

Buzhen participated in the Tang-Goguryeo war in 645 and the Battle of Irtysh River where Tang armies defeated Ashina Helu. In 657 he was appointed Jiwangjue Khagan to rule over five Western Turkic tribes by Emperor Gaozong. In 659 he participated in a campaign alongside Mishe against rival claimant to the title of khagan, Zhenzhu Yabgu, near Shuanghe. in 662 Gaozong sent the general Su Haizheng (蘇海政) to attack Qiuzi and ordered Buzhen and Mishe to assist him. Buzhen, continuing his rivalry with Mishe, falsely informed Su that Mishe was preparing to rebel and would attack the Tang army; Su responded by ambushing Mishe, killing him and his chief assistants. Shunishi chief Chupan (鼠尼施處半啜) and Basaigan chief Tong Ishbara (拔塞幹暾沙鉢俟斤), angry over Ashina Mishe's death, turned away from Tang and submitted to the Tibetan Empire instead. When Buzhen died in 667, Tang influence in the region was greatly reduced.

References

Sources 

 Old Book of Tang - Tujue Biographies (旧唐书·突厥传)
 Zizhi Tongjian / Volume 200

7th-century Turkic people
Ashina house of the Turkic Empire
Tang dynasty generals at war against the Göktürks
Tang dynasty generals at war against Goguryeo
Göktürk khagans